This is a list of notable economists, mathematicians, political scientists, and computer scientists whose work has added substantially to the field of game theory.

 Derek Abbott - quantum game theory and Parrondo's games
 Susanne Albers - algorithmic game theory and algorithm analysis
 Kenneth Arrow - voting theory (Bank of Sweden Prize in Economic Sciences in Memory of Alfred Nobel 1972)
 Robert Aumann - equilibrium theory (Bank of Sweden Prize in Economic Sciences in Memory of Alfred Nobel 2005)
 Robert Axelrod - repeated Prisoner's Dilemma
 Tamer Başar - dynamic game theory and application robust control of systems with uncertainty
 Cristina Bicchieri - epistemology of game theory
 Olga Bondareva - Bondareva–Shapley theorem
 Steven Brams - cake cutting, fair division, theory of moves
 Jennifer Tour Chayes - algorithmic game theory and auction algorithms
 John Horton Conway - combinatorial game theory
 Olivier Gossner - value of information, bounded rationality
 William Hamilton - evolutionary biology
 John Harsanyi - equilibrium theory (Bank of Sweden Prize in Economic Sciences in Memory of Alfred Nobel 1994)
 Monika Henzinger - algorithmic game theory and information retrieval
 Naira Hovakimyan - differential games and adaptive control
 Peter L. Hurd - evolution of aggressive behavior
 Rufus Isaacs - differential games
 Ehud Kalai - Kalai-Smorodinski bargaining solution, rational learning, strategic complexity
 Anna Karlin - algorithmic game theory and online algorithms
 Michael Kearns - algorithmic game theory and computational social science
 Sarit Kraus - non-monotonic reasoning
 Ehud Lehrer - Repeated games, approachability theory
 John Maynard Smith - evolutionary biology
 Oskar Morgenstern - social organization
 John Forbes Nash - Nash equilibrium (Bank of Sweden Prize in Economic Sciences in Memory of Alfred Nobel 1994)
 John von Neumann - Minimax theorem, expected utility, social organization, arms race
 Abraham Neyman - Stochastic games, Shapley value
 J. M. R. Parrondo - games with a reversal of fortune, such as Parrondo's games
 Charles E. M. Pearce - games applied to queuing theory
 George R. Price - theoretical and evolutionary biology
 Anatol Rapoport - Mathematical psychologist, early proponent of tit-for-tat in repeated Prisoner's Dilemma
 Julia Robinson - proved that fictitious play dynamics converges to the mixed strategy Nash equilibrium in two-player zero-sum games
 Alvin E. Roth - market design  (Nobel Memorial Prize in Economic Sciences 2012)
 Ariel Rubinstein - bargaining theory, learning and language
 Thomas Jerome Schaefer - computational complexity of perfect-information games
 Suzanne Scotchmer - patent law incentive models
 Reinhard Selten - bounded rationality  (Bank of Sweden Prize in Economic Sciences in Memory of Alfred Nobel 1994)
 Claude Shannon - studied cryptography and chess; sometimes called "the father of information theory"
 Lloyd Shapley - Shapley value and core concept in coalition games (Nobel Memorial Prize in Economic Sciences 2012)
 Eilon Solan - Stochastic games, stopping games
 Thomas Schelling - bargaining (Bank of Sweden Prize in Economic Sciences in Memory of Alfred Nobel 2005) and models of segregation
 Nicolas Vieille - Stochastic games
 Myrna Wooders - coalition theory

References 

Lists of mathematicians by field
Lists of people by occupation